The 2012 Maryland Terrapins football team represented the University of Maryland, College Park in the 2012 NCAA Division I FBS football season. The Terrapins were led by second-year head coach Randy Edsall and played their home games at Byrd Stadium. It was the Terrapins' 60th season as a member of the Atlantic Coast Conference (ACC) and their eighth season in the ACC's Atlantic Division.

The 2012 Terrapins team was best known for its troubles at quarterback, with four lost for the season after injuries and resorting to freshman linebacker Shawn Petty, who was a Quarterback in High School at nearby Eleanor Roosevelt High School.

Schedule

Coaching staff

Notes

References

Maryland
Maryland Terrapins football seasons
Maryland Terrapins football